The Commonwealth Star (also known as the Federation Star, the Seven Point Star, or the Star of Federation) is a seven-pointed star symbolizing the Federation of Australia which came into force on 1 January 1901.

Six points of the Star represent the six original states of the Commonwealth of Australia, while the seventh point represents the territories and any other future states of Australia. The original star had only six points; however, the proclamation in 1905 of the Territory of Papua led to the addition of the seventh point in 1909 to represent it and future territories.

The Commonwealth Star is one of the distinguishing characteristics of the Australian flag.

Official name
Although the term "Federation Star" is frequently used, the term "Commonwealth Star" is the official name. This is because that was the name ascribed to the star by the Australian Government when the Australian flag was adopted and such adoption was gazetted in the official Government gazette.

Usage
The Commonwealth Star is found on both the flag of Australia and the Coat of Arms of Australia. On the Australian flag the Star appears in the lower hoist quarter, beneath the representation of the Union flag, and as four of the five stars making up the Southern Cross on the fly. In the Coat of Arms, the Star forms the crest, atop a blue and gold wreath.

The Star also appears on the badges of the Australian Defence Force and Australian Federal Police, although the badges of the Australian Army, Royal Australian Navy and Royal Australian Air Force feature the St Edward's Crown, as in the United Kingdom and other Commonwealth realms. In the event of the country becoming a republic, it has been suggested that the Commonwealth Star replace the Crown.

The Star is also used on numerous Australian medals, including the National Police Service Medal, the Defence Force Service Medal, the civilian Star of Courage, the Public Service Medal, the Ambulance Service Medal and the Australian Police Medal.

With the marriage of Frederik, Crown Prince of Denmark to Mary Donaldson (now the Crown Princess Mary) in 2004, Princess Mary was honoured with the Order of the Elephant. The chief field of the Crown Princess' coat of arms shows two gold Commonwealth Stars from the Coat of arms of Australia.

Gallery

See also 
 Southern Cross
 Southern Horizon

References 

National symbols of Australia
Star symbols
Heraldic charges
Symbols introduced in 1901
1901 in Australia